Battle of Cambrai may refer to one of two British World War I campaigns near the town of Cambrai, France:

Battle of Cambrai (1917), a British military offensive that involved the first successful use of tanks and combined arms
Battle of Cambrai (1918), a British military offensive during the Hundred Days Offensive of World War I

See also
 War of the League of Cambrai, 1508-1516

sv:Slaget vid Cambrai